Dato' Johari bin Abdul (Jawi: جوهري بن عبد; born 25 May 1955) is a Malaysian politician who has served as the 11th Speaker of the Dewan Rakyat since December 2022. He served as the State Leader of the Opposition of Kedah from October 2022 and Member of the Kedah State Legislative Assembly (MLA) for Gurun from May 2018 to his resignations in December 2022, the Member of Parliament (MP) for Sungai Petani from March 2008 and Chairman of the Pakatan Harapan Backbenchers Club (PHBBC) from August 2018 to November 2022. He is a member of the People's Justice Party (PKR), a component party of the Pakatan Harapan (PH) coalition.

Early life and education 
Johari bin Abdul was born in Tikam Batu, Sungai Petani, Kedah, Federation of Malaya. His uncle, Datuk Haji Shuaib bin Haji Lazim was a prominent political figure of UMNO in Sungai Petani and was once appointed as senator in Dewan Negara from April 1985 until July 1991. He went to Tikam Batu High School and Ibrahim High School, Sungai Petani before further his studies to University of Malaya. He received Bachelor of Arts (BA) from University of Malaya. He has a Master of Arts (MA) in Strategic Studies from the University of Lancaster. He also attended to National Institute of Public Administration (INTAN) to become the Administrative and Diplomatic Officer (PTD).

Early career
He was appointed the officer in Kuala Lumpur City Hall (DBKL) and Public Service Department Malaysia (JPA). Then, he served as director of the investment department for Yayasan Dakwah Islamiah Malaysia (YADIM). He also served as director of the National Civics Bureau (BTN).

Political career 
He was elected as the MP for Sungai Petani in the 2008 general election, defeating Minister of Information Zainuddin Maidin from the ruling Barisan Nasional (BN) coalition and re-elected in the 2013 and 2018 general elections. He was also elected as the MLA for Gurun in the 2018 general election, defeating Leong Yong Kong from the ruling BN coalition.

He has also served as the State Chairman of PH of Kedah from March 2020 until September 2022.

Speaker of the Dewan Rakyat
A week before the first session of the 15th Dewan Rakyat, he vacated his seat for Gurun in the Kedah State Legislative assembly. This was then followed by his nomination to the position of the Speaker of the Dewan Rakyat by the Prime Minister Anwar Ibrahim. He won the vote by 147 to 74 to become the 11th Speaker of the Dewan Rakyat.

Personal life
He is married and has 8 children, including Mohammed Taufiq Johari, a doctor and who has succeeded him as the member of parliament for Sungai Petani in the 2022 general election. The others are Mohammed Iqbal Johari and Mohammed Firdaus Johari, both of them who are businessmen. Nurul Huda Johari, Nur Fahimah Johari and Suraya Johari, who three of them are dentists and Muhammad Ibrahim Johari who are physician. The youngest one is Muhammad Yusuf Johari.

Honours

Honours of Malaysia
  :
  Knight Companion of the Order of Loyalty to the Royal House of Kedah (DSDK) – Dato' (2009)

Election results

References

Living people
1955 births
People from Kedah
Malaysian people of Malay descent
Malaysian Muslims
People's Justice Party (Malaysia) politicians
Members of the Kedah State Legislative Assembly
Members of the Dewan Rakyat
Alumni of Lancaster University
21st-century Malaysian politicians
Speakers of the Dewan Rakyat